Marie-Josée Riel also known as Emjay (born December 9, 1974) is a Canadian eurodance musician.

Musical career
After fronting a local Ottawa band for several years, she recorded a solo project in 1994 and signed a recording contract. She released several singles and one album in her career.

In 2000, she received a Juno Award nomination for Best Dance Recording, for her single "Over and Over".

In July 2018, Emjay announced she would be releasing a new single. It would be her first original release in nearly 20 years. She continues to perform occasionally in Toronto, Ottawa and Montreal nightclubs.

Discography

Studio albums

Singles

References

Living people
Musicians from Ottawa
Canadian techno musicians
Eurodance musicians
1974 births
Franco-Ontarian people
21st-century Canadian women singers